Intuition is an album by jazz pianist Bill Evans, released in 1975. It features Evans and bassist Eddie Gómez performing duo. It was reissued on CD by Original Jazz Classics in 1990.

Reception
The Allmusic review awarded the album 4 stars.

Track listing
 "Invitation" (Bronisław Kaper, Paul Francis Webster) – 6:28
 "Blue Serge" (Mercer Ellington) – 5:09
 "Show-Type Tune" (Bill Evans) – 4:08
 "The Nature of Things" (Irvin Rochlin) – 3:25
 "Are You All the Things" (Bill Evans) – 5:00
 "A Face Without a Name" (Claus Ogerman) – 5:37
 "Falling Grace" (Steve Swallow) – 4:28
 "Hi Lili, Hi Lo (For Ellaine)" (Bronisław Kaper, Helen Deutsch) – 7:16

Personnel
Bill Evans - piano, Rhodes
Eddie Gómez – bass
Production notes
Helen Keane – producer
Don Cody – engineer

Chart positions

References

1975 albums
Bill Evans albums
Fantasy Records albums